Octavian Bodișteanu (born 15 May 1977) is a jurist and Minister of Youth and Sports of Republic of Moldova from May 31, 2013 until December 10, 2014, replacing Octavian Țîcu and being succeeded by Sergei Afanasenco.

Activity
Between 2011 and 2013, Bodișteanu was Deputy Minister of Youth and Sports of the Republic of Moldova.

Octavian Bodișteanu is a former performance sportsman (multiple national and international champion of free wrestling, master in sports), lawyer, the first honorary citizen in his native village.

Family
He is married to singer Janet Erhan and has three children, Daniela, Alex and Bogdan.

References

External links 
Octavian Bodișteanu at the Moldovan Government's website

1977 births
Living people
Liberal Democratic Party of Moldova politicians
People from Hîncești District